Vasily Ivanovich Zakharyashchev (24 January 1946 – 28 January 2023) was a Russian politician. A member of United Russia, he served in the State Duma from 2007 to 2011.

Zakharyashchev died on 28 January 2023, at the age of 77.

References

1946 births
2023 deaths
Fifth convocation members of the State Duma (Russian Federation)
Saint-Petersburg State Forestry University alumni
United Russia politicians
People from Sapozhkovsky District